Labra is a surname. Notable people with the surname include:

Armando Labra (1943–2006), Mexican economist
Berting Labra (1933–2009), Filipino actor
Carilda Oliver Labra (1922–2018), Cuban poet
Carlos Fernando Flores Labra (born 1943), Chilean engineer, entrepreneur and politician
Onofre Jarpa Labra (1849–1940), Chilean landscape painter
Patricia Labra (born 1986), Chilean lawyer 
Rafael María de Labra (1840–1918), Spanish educator and politician

Spanish-language surnames